Kim Ahn-ro (1481 – 27 October 1537) was a Korean Joseon Dynasty politician and scholar. His pen name was Huirakdang, Yongcheon, Toejae, and his customary name was Yisuk. He was from the Yeonan Kim clan.

Family  
 Great-Grandfather 
 Kim Hae (김해, 金侅)
 Grandfather 
 Kim Woo-shin (김우신, 金友臣)
 Grandmother 
 Lady Lee of the Incheon Lee clan (이천 이씨)
 Father 
 Kim Heun (김흔, 金訢) (1448 - 1492)
 Uncle - Kim Sim (김심, 金諶)
 Uncle - Kim Jeon (김전, 金詮) (1458 - 1523)
 Aunt - Lady No of the Pungcheon No clan (풍천 노씨)
 Aunt - Lady Song of the Jincheon Song clan (진천 송씨)
 Cousin - Kim Ahn-do (김안도, 金安道)
 Cousin - Kim Ahn-woo (김안우, 金安遇)
 Cousin - Kim Ahn-soo (김안수, 金安遂)
 Cousin - Kim Ahn-dal (김안달, 金安達)
 Mother
 Lady Yun (윤씨)
 Grandfather - Yun Ji (윤지, 尹墀)
 Siblings 
 Older brother - Kim Ahn-se (김안세, 金安世)
 Older brother - Kim Ahn-jeong (김안정, 金安鼎)
 Wife and children
 Lady Chae of the Incheon Chae clan (정경부인 인천 채씨, 貞敬夫人 仁川 蔡氏); daughter of Chae Su (채수, 蔡壽) (25 August 1449 - 12 December 1515)
 Son - Kim Gi (김기, 金祺)
 Son - Kim Hui (김희, 金禧) (? - 1531)
 Daughter-in-law - Yi Ok-ha (이옥하, 李玉荷), Princess Hyohye (효혜공주) (13 June 1511 - 6 May 1531)
 Granddaughter - Kim Seon-ok (김선옥, 金善玉), Lady Kim of the Yeonan Kim clan (연안 김씨, 延安 金氏) (1531 - ?)
 Grandson-in-law - Yun Baek-won (윤백원, 尹百源) (1528 - 1589)
 Great-Granddaughter - Yun Gae-mi-chi (윤개미치, 尹介未致), Lady Yun of the Paepyeong Yun clan (파평 윤씨, 坡平 尹氏) (? - 1589)
 Daughter - Lady Kim of the Yeonan Kim clan (연안 김씨, 延安 金氏); died prematurely

Site Web 
 Kim Ahn-ro 
 Kim Ahn-ro 
 Kim Ahn-ro 
 권력 농단하다 먹칠이 된 이름 '김안로'  The Chosun 
 먹칠이 된 이름 '김안로'

References

1529 births
1589 deaths
Korean admirals
Korean generals
Military history of Korea
Korean military personnel killed in action
16th-century Korean poets
16th-century Korean calligraphers